Bayo may refer to:
Bayo, Nigeria, a Local Government Area of Borno State, Nigeria
Bayo (Grado), a civil parish in Asturias, Spain
Bayo (film), a 1985 Canadian movie

People with the name
Alberto Bayo, Cuban Loyalist
Getuli Bayo, Tanzanian marathon runner
María Bayo, Spanish soprano
Zebedayo Bayo, Tanzanian long-distance runner
Bayo Ojikutu, Nigerian author

See also
Baio (disambiguation)
Cerro Bayo (disambiguation)